San Pedro is the top female volleyball team of San Pedro de Macorís.

History
The team was founded in 2007.

References

League Official website

San Pedro de Macorís
Dominican Republic volleyball clubs
Volleyball clubs established in 2007